Kennedia lateritia, commonly known as Augusta kennedia, is a species of flowering plant in the family Fabaceae and is endemic to the south-west of Western Australia. It is a woody climber with twining stems, trifoliate leaves and orange-red and yellow flowers arranged in groups of up to twenty-four.

Description
The standard petal is brick red with a yellow base and the wings are about the same length as the keel.

Taxonomy
Kennedia lateritia was first formally described in 1864 by Ferdinand von Mueller in Fragmenta Phytographiae Australiae. The specific epithet (lateritia) means "brick red".

Distribution and habitat
Augusta kennedia grows in low coastal heath, often among granite outcrops in the Augusta-Cape Leeuwin area of south-western Western Australia.

Conservation status
This species of twining pea is listed as "endangered" under the Australian Government Environment Protection and Biodiversity Conservation Act 1999 and as "Threatened Flora (Declared Rare Flora — Extant)" (as Kennedia macrophylla) by the Department of Biodiversity, Conservation and Attractions. The main threats to the species include trampling by tourists, inappropriate fire regimes and land clearing.

References

External links
Australasian Virtual Herbarium (AVH): Occurrence data for Kennedia lateritia'
 

Fabales of Australia
Plants described in 1864
Taxa named by Ferdinand von Mueller
Rosids of Western Australia
lateritia
Endemic flora of Southwest Australia